Corinna Mura (born Corinna Wall; March 16, 1910 – August 1, 1965) was a cabaret singer, actress, and diseuse. She had a small role in the classic film Casablanca as the woman playing the guitar while singing "Tango Delle Rose" and "La Marseillaise" at Rick's Café Américain.

Biography
Mura was born in Mexico City, Mexico in 1910.  As a child she was trained by her parents to become a coloratura soprano. She sang three times for President Franklin D. Roosevelt. In 1944, Mura appeared in Cole Porter's hit Broadway musical Mexican Hayride, and can be heard in two numbers on the Decca original-cast album. She was stepmother to author/illustrator Edward Gorey.

Death
She died in Mexico City on 1 August 1965, at 55 years of age, from cancer.

Filmography

References

External links

 
 
 
 
 

1910 births
1965 deaths
Cabaret singers
Deaths from cancer in Mexico
American film actresses
Place of birth missing
20th-century American actresses
20th-century American singers
American expatriates in Mexico
20th-century American women singers